The 1961 Arkansas Razorbacks football team represented the University of Arkansas in the Southwest Conference (SWC) during the 1961 NCAA University Division football season. In their fourth year under head coach Frank Broyles, the Razorbacks compiled an 8–3 record (6–1 against SWC opponents), finished in a tie with Texas for the SWC championship, and outscored all opponents by a combined total of 183 to 97.  The Razorbacks' only losses during the regular season came against Mississippi by a 16–0 score and to Texas by a 33–7 score. The team was ranked #9 in the final AP Poll and #8 in the final UPI Coaches Poll and went on to lose to the undefeated national champion Alabama Crimson Tide in the 1962 Sugar Bowl by a 10–3 score.

Arkansas halfback Lance Alworth was selected by the Football Writers Association of America as a first-team player on the 1961 College Football All-America Team.  He was also honored as a second-team All-American by the Associated Press and United Press International. Alworth was later inducted into both the College Football Hall of Fame and Pro Football Hall of Fame.

Schedule

Personnel

References

Arkansas
Arkansas Razorbacks football seasons
Southwest Conference football champion seasons
Arkansas Razorbacks football